Jackson Township is one of the fourteen townships of Union County, Ohio, United States.  The 2010 census found 966 people in the township.

Geography
Located in the northwestern corner of the county, it borders the following townships:
Bowling Green Township, Marion County - north
Green Camp Township, Marion County - northeast
Prospect Township, Marion County - east
Claibourne Township - south
York Township - southwest
Washington Township - west

No municipalities are located in Jackson Township.

Name and history
Jackson Township was organized in 1829. It is one of thirty-seven Jackson Townships statewide.

Government
The township is governed by a three-member board of trustees, who are elected in November of odd-numbered years to a four-year term beginning on the following January 1. Two are elected in the year after the presidential election and one is elected in the year before it. There is also an elected township fiscal officer, who serves a four-year term beginning on April 1 of the year after the election, which is held in November of the year before the presidential election. Vacancies in the fiscal officership or on the board of trustees are filled by the remaining trustees.

References

External links
County website

Townships in Union County, Ohio
Townships in Ohio